Kalteng Putra Football Club is an Indonesian football club based in Palangka Raya, Central Kalimantan, Indonesia. They currently compete in the Liga 2. Their best achievement was when in 2011–12 Indonesian Premier Division, they became champions after occupying the first place in the grand final standings, in the first match, they beat Perseman Manokwari 1–0 and drew 0–0 against Pro Duta in the second match.

History
The club was founded as Persepar Palangkaraya on 1 January 1970 in the form of "Perserikatan era". At that time, this competition consists of 48 clubs. J. J. Koetin is a football figure and the first chairman of Kalteng Putra since the establishment of this club, 23 years J. J. Koetin became chairman of Kalteng Putra since 1970–1993. The next Kalteng Putra's chairman is Nahson Taway in 1993–1998. and continued the next period in 1998–2001 which is chaired by Drs. Hendry Yunus.

In 2001–2005 when the chairman of Kalteng Putra Drs. Andi Hamzah in 2001, Kalteng Putra participated in Division 2 and Kalteng Putra has become a national club. On 2001, Kalteng Putra became an official club after being recognized by the PSSI as their member.

After the era of Andi Hamzah, the next Kalteng Putra's chairman is Tuah Pahoe in 2006, Kalteng Putra participated in the national 1st division. In 2005, the club was coached by Salahudin, and qualified to division 1 league Indonesia. In 2007, the club was coached by Hartono Ruslan. In 2008, Tuah Pahoe died of disease and Kalteng Putra is still participating in division 1 and coached by Suharto. In 2009, Kalteng Putra coached by Inyong Lolombulan, then replaced by Nandar Iskandar.

In the 2010 season, Kalteng Putra was coached by Eko Tamamie, and Wahyudi F Dirun became chairman of Persepar in 2009. The next chairman is Tuty Dau. In the 2011–2012 Season, Kalteng Putra became champion in the Divisi Utama who coached by Agus Sutyono. In the 2013 season, Kalteng Putra participate in Indonesia Premier League.

Name changed

 Persepar Palangkaraya (1970–2001) (Perserikatan era)
 Persepar Kalteng Putra (2001–2013)
 Kalteng Putra (2013–present)

Stadium 
Kalteng Putra FC's home stadium is Tuah Pahoe Stadium in Palangkaraya.

Kit suppliers 
  Lotto (2010–2011)
  Adidas (2011–2012)
  Mitre (2012–2015)
  MBB (2017–2019)
  Adhoc (2020)
  WWJD Sport (2021– present)

Players

Current squad

Coaching Staff

Supporters 

Kalteng Putra FC have two biggest supporters group, the Pasus 1970 and the Kalman or Kalteng Mania.
Usually the Pasus 1970 use black attribute and the Kalman use red attribute or the Bahandang in Dayak language mean Red.

Honours

National Leagues 
Indonesian Premier Division/Liga 2
 Champion (1): 2011–2012
Third place (1): 2018

National Cups 
Indonesia President's Cup
 Semifinalist (1): 2019

References

External links
 Kalteng Putra FC official website
 

 
Football clubs in Indonesia
Football clubs in Central Kalimantan
Association football clubs established in 1970
1970 establishments in Indonesia